John Donald Smith (September 12, 1919 – October 22, 1997) was a Canadian politician. He served in the Legislative Assembly of British Columbia from 1956 to 1966 as a Social Credit member for the constituency of Victoria City.

References

British Columbia Social Credit Party MLAs
1919 births
1997 deaths